William "Brodie" Buckland (born 12 December 1983) is an American-born Australian rower. He participated in the 2012 Summer Olympics in London where he competed in the men's pair event together with his teammate James Marburg. They qualified for the A finals, where they reached a fifth place.  He graduated from Harvard University in 2006. Buckland was born in Longmont, Colorado, and raised in Olympia, Washington.

References

External links
 
 
 
 

1983 births
Living people
Australian male rowers
Olympic rowers of Australia
Rowers at the 2012 Summer Olympics
Harvard Crimson rowers
American expatriates in Australia